Citizen X or CitizenX may refer to:
 Citizen X, a 1995 American television film
 Citizen X (TV series), a 2011 Egyptian TV series
 Citizen X (video game), a 2002 video game developed by Digital Pictures
 CitizenX, a pseudonym for Glenn Jacobs, mayor of Knox County also known as the WWE wrestler "Kane"
 Citizen X (character), a member of the new Crusaders (D.C. comics) created by S.H.A.D.E.

See also
 Citizen V, a codename for several Marvel comic book characters
 Citizen AA, a sports club in Hong Kong First Division League
 "The Unknown Citizen", a 1939 poem written by W. H. Auden
 Organization X, a fighting force and resistance organization in Greece
 Party X, a political party in Poland
 X Party, a political party in Spain
 Comrade X, a 1940 American film
 Comrade (disambiguation)
 Citizen (disambiguation)
 The Citizen (disambiguation)
 Good Citizen (disambiguation)
 Mr. Citizen (disambiguation)
 Citizen Dog (disambiguation)
 Citizen Force (disambiguation)
 Citizen Soldier (disambiguation)
 Citizen of Paris (disambiguation)
 Mobile Citizen (disambiguation)
 Non-citizen (disambiguation)
 X (disambiguation)
 Doctor X (disambiguation)
 Professor X (disambiguation)
 Lady X (disambiguation)
 Madame X (disambiguation)
 Miss X (disambiguation)
 Mister X (disambiguation)
 Jane Doe (disambiguation)
 Citizen Jane (disambiguation)
 Citizen Joe, a 2005 Stargate SG-1 episode
 John Doe (disambiguation)
 Joe Public (disambiguation)
 John Q. Citizen (or John Q. Public), a generic name in the United States used to denote a hypothetical member of society deemed a "common man" or "man on the street"
 Plebs, the general body of free ancient Roman citizens
 Average Joe, a common North American term to refer to a completely average person
 Joe Bloggs, a commonly used fictional name in British English
 Joe Shmoe, a commonly used fictional name in American English
 J. Random X, types of "random" (meaning "arbitrary") categories of people in computer lore
 Man on the street, short interviews with members of the public
 T.C. Mits (acronym for "the celebrated man in the street"), a term coined by Lillian Rosanoff Lieber to refer to an everyman
 Reasonable person, a hypothetical person of legal fiction
 The man on the Clapham omnibus, a hypothetical ordinary and reasonable person in English law
 Man on the Bondi tram, an ordinary person used in civil law in New South Wales, Australia
 Placeholder name, words that can refer to objects or people whose names are temporarily forgotten, irrelevant, or unknown
 Commoner (disambiguation)
 Everyman (disambiguation)
 The Masses (disambiguation)
 Tom, Dick, and Harry (disambiguation)
 Voice of the people (disambiguation)
 Vox populi (disambiguation)
 List of terms related to an average person
 Global citizenship, the idea that all people have rights and civic responsibilities that come with being a member of the world